The 1973 NCAA Skiing Championships were contested at the Middlebury College Snow Bowl in Hancock, Vermont at the twentieth annual NCAA-sanctioned ski tournament to determine the individual and team national champions of men's collegiate alpine skiing, cross-country skiing, and ski jumping in the United States.

Defending champion Colorado, coached by alumnus Bill Marolt, captured their fourth, and second consecutive, national championship, finishing 4.04 points ahead of Wyoming in the team standings.

These were the first NCAA championships in which Denver did not finish in either first (fourteen titles) or second (five times).

Repeat champions were Colorado's Vidar Nilsgard (jumping) and Kim Kendall (skimeister) of New Hampshire,

Venue

This year's championships were held March 7–10 in Vermont at the Middlebury College Snow Bowl in Hancock. Middlebury College, located in nearby Middlebury, served as hosts.

The twentieth edition, these were the second NCAA championships hosted by Middlebury (1961), third in Vermont (Northfield, 1955), and seventh in the East, all in New England.

Program changes
This was the final year that skimeister was included in the event program. This award went to the skier with the best performance across all four disciplines.

Team scoring

Individual events

Four events were held, which yielded seven individual titles.
Wednesday: Cross Country
Thursday: Slalom
Friday: Downhill
Saturday: Jumping

See also
List of NCAA skiing programs

References

NCAA Skiing Championships
NCAA Skiing Championships
NCAA Skiing Championships
NCAA Skiing Championships
NCAA Skiing Championships
NCAA Skiing Championships
NCAA Skiing Championships
Skiing in Vermont